Sean Geoffrey Clingeleffer (born 9 May 1980) is an Australian former cricketer who played for Tasmania. He plays his club cricket for North Hobart Cricket Club.
 
Although a difficult batsman to remove, his defensive style has caused criticism. After eight seasons with Tasmania and being a major part of their success in the Pura Cup Final in 2006–07 – scoring a century – he was dropped in 2007/08 after scoring 103 runs in five matches and subsequently not offered a contract for the 2008/09 season.

References

External links 
 

1980 births
Living people
Australian cricketers
Tasmania cricketers
People educated at St Virgil's College
Cricketers from Hobart
Wicket-keepers